This is a list of the main career statistics of former professional tennis player Gabriela Sabatini.

Major finals

Grand Slam finals

Singles: 3 (1 title, 2 runner–ups)

Women's doubles: 4 (1 title, 3 runner–ups)

Olympics

Singles: 1 (1 silver medal)

Year-end championships finals

Singles: 4 (2 titles, 2 runner–ups)

WTA Tour finals

Singles: 55 (27 titles, 28 runner–ups)

Doubles: 30 (14 titles, 16 runner–ups)

Grand Slam performance timelines

Singles

Doubles

WTA Tour career earnings

Record against other top players
Sabatini's win-loss record against certain players who have been ranked World No. 10 or higher is as follows:

Players who have been ranked World No. 1 are in boldface.

 Arantxa Sánchez Vicario 12–11
 Lindsay Davenport 7–3
 Dominique Monami 1–0
 Martina Hingis 1–1
 Chris Evert 3–6
/ Karina Habšudová 2–0
 Mary Joe Fernández 13–10
/ Helena Suková 12–6
 Jennifer Capriati 11–5
 Steffi Graf 11–29
 Nathalie Tauziat 10–1
 Zina Garrison 10–3
/ Jana Novotná 10–3
 Conchita Martínez 9–6
 Katerina Maleeva 8–1
/ Natasha Zvereva 8–1
 Amanda Coetzer 7–1
/ Manuela Maleeva 7–2
 Pam Shriver 7–5
 Kathy Rinaldi 6–0
 Julie Halard-Decugis 6–1
 Chanda Rubin 6–3
/ Martina Navratilova 6–15
 Brenda Schultz-McCarthy 5–0
 Sylvia Hanika 5–1
 Lori McNeil 5–2
 Mary Pierce 4–1
 Kimiko Date-Krumm 4–3
 Anke Huber 4–3
 Bettina Bunge 3–0
 Jo Durie 3–0
 Dianne Fromholtz 3–1
 Claudia Kohde-Kilsch 3–2
// Monica Seles 3–11
 Kathy Jordan 2–0
 Catarina Lindqvist 2–0
 Sandrine Testud 2–0
 Carling Bassett-Seguso 2–1
 Lisa Bonder 2–1
 Kathleen Horvath 2–1
 Barbara Paulus 2–1
 Irina Spîrlea 2–2
/ Hana Mandlíková 2–5
 Tracy Austin 1–0
 Ai Sugiyama 1–0
 Andrea Temesvári 1–0
 Wendy Turnbull 1–0
 Barbara Potter 1–1
 Iva Majoli 1–2
 Stephanie Rehe 1–2
 Bonnie Gadusek 0–1
 Magdalena Maleeva 0–1

See also
 Performance timelines for all female tennis players who reached at least one Grand Slam final
 Graf–Sabatini rivalry

References

External links
 
 
 
 

Sabatini, Gabriela